is a Japanese voice actress from Obihiro, Hokkaido, Japan. She is represented by Ken Production.

Filmography

Anime
2003
Konjiki no Gash Bell!! (Children)

2006
Brighter than the Dawning Blue (Mai Asagiri)
Happiness! (Sumomo Kohinata)

2007
Nanatsuiro Drops (Yuki-chan)
You're Under Arrest: Full Throttle (Female Police Officer)
ef: a tale of memories (Mizuki Hayama)

2008
Hakken Taiken Daisuki! Shimajirō (Yatsu-kun)
Nogizaka Haruka no Himitsu (Mika Nogizaka)
Kemeko Deluxe! (Tamako Kobayashi)

2009
K-ON! (Student)
Fullmetal Alchemist: Brotherhood (May Chang)
Nogizaka Haruka no Himitsu: Purezza (Mika Nogizaka)
Shin Koihime Musō (Ryūbi / Gentoku / Tōka)
11eyes(Yuka Minase)

2010
Ladies versus Butlers! (Pina Suforumukuran Estoh)
The Qwaser of Stigmata (Astarte)
Shin Koihime Musō: Otome Tairan (Ryūbi / Gentoku / Tōka)
Blessing of the Campanella (Ritos Tortilla)
Shakugan no Shana S (Yukino Ozaki)

2011
Cardfight!! Vanguard (De Toilette)
Phi-Brain - Puzzle of God (Airi Mizutani)
Mashiroiro Symphony (Sakuno Uryū)
Haganai (Female Student)

2012
Phi-Brain - Puzzle of God: The Orpheus Order (Airi Mizutani)

2013
Angel's Drop (Shinobu)
Pupipō! (Reiko Azuma)

2014
Buddy Complex (Tsubasa Watase)

2016
Wagamama High Spec (Toa Narumi)
Rin-ne (Yukina)

2019
Circlet Princess (Nina Avelin)

Games
2006
Yoake Mae yori Ruri Iro na -Brighter than dawning blue- (Mai Asagiri) 

2007
Happiness! Deluxe (Sumomo Kohinata)
Nanatsuiro★Drops Pure!! (Yuki-chan, Autumn Princess Karin)

2008
Nogizaka Haruka no Himitsu: Cosplay, Hajimemashita♥ (Mika Nogizaka)

2009
Dengeki Gakuen RPG: Cross of Venus (Mika Nogizaka)
11eyes CrossOver (Yuka Minase)
Time Leap (Komomo Shinonome)

2010
Ar tonelico Qoga: Knell of Ar Ciel (Saki)
Yoake Mae yori Ruri Iro na Portable (Mai Asagiri)
Nogizaka Haruka no Himitsu: Doujinshi Hajimemashita♥ (Mika Nogizaka)
Tenshin Ranman: Happy Go Lucky!! (Sana Chitose)
ef - a fairy tale of the two. (Mizuki Hayama)
Blaze Union: Story to Reach the Future (Elena)
Narcissu ~Moshimo Ashita ga Aru Nara~ (Chisato Kusunoki)
Twinkle ☆ Crusaders Go Go (Pakki)
Shukufuku no Campanella Portable (Ritos Tortilla)

2011
Mashiro Iro Symphony: *mutsu no hana (Sakuno Uryū)

2012
Generation of Chaos: Pandora’s Reflection (Dominic)
Suiheisen made Nan Mile? - Deep Blue Sky & Pure White Wings - (Mariya Hanami)

References

External links

1982 births
Living people
People from Obihiro, Hokkaido
Japanese voice actresses
Voice actresses from Hokkaido
21st-century Japanese actresses
Ken Production voice actors